Virgin Field is the first full-length studio album by The Teenage Kissers. It was released July 9, 2014. The album features a cover of the song "Sunday Morning" by The Velvet Underground.

Three singles have been released from the album: "Feel Sick", "I Love You and Kiss Me". and the double a-side, "Needle/Crystal Swan".

Track listing

Personnel
 Nana Kitade – Vocals, Lyrics
 Hideo Nekota – Bass
 Mai Koike – Drums
 Tsubasa Nakada – Guitar

References

External links
 Official Website

2014 albums
The Teenage Kissers albums